Petra Beňušková is a Slovak handball player for Stella St-Maur Handball and the Slovak national team.

References

1982 births
Living people
Slovak female handball players
People from Partizánske
Sportspeople from the Trenčín Region
Slovak expatriate sportspeople in France